The first season of Asia's Got Talent (AGT) started airing on March 12, 2015, across 15 countries in Asia, culminating to a grand final airing nine weeks later on May 14, 2015. It featured a grand prize of US$100,000 and an opportunity to perform at the Marina Bay Sands.

The show is hosted by Marc Nelson and Rovilson Fernandez; while the judges are Anggun, David Foster, Melanie C, and Vanness Wu. This show is also co-hosted by Singaporean YouTuber and Power98FM DJ's Dee Kosh for sneak previews, highlights, recaps, and behind the scenes.

The Filipino shadow play group El Gamma Penumbra was declared as the first season winner. News of their win leaked early through social media even before the broadcast of the results, causing dismay among netizens due to the spoiler nature of the leak.

Auditions

The following were the locations for the open ground auditions:

Auditionees were also allowed to submit their audition videos online via the show's official website.

Auditions in front of the judges (and a live audience) were held on January 13–14, 16–18, 20–22, 2015 at the Pinewood Iskandar Malaysia Studios in Johor, Malaysia. They would be screened across five episodes.

The judges' auditions also feature the Golden Buzzer. Each judge would have one chance to use the Golden Buzzer. The so-called Golden Acts, those on whom the Golden Buzzer is used, would automatically advance to the Semi-Finals. Wu was the first to press the Golden Buzzer on Japanese popping act Time Machine, followed by Melanie C on Chinese acrobat-dancer couple Gao Lin and Liu Xin and Anggun on Filipino shadow play group El Gamma Penumbra. Foster was the last judge to push the Golden Buzzer, using it on Filipina singer/soprano Gerphil Flores.

Auditions summary

Auditions 1

Auditions 2

Auditions 3

Semifinals
The deliberation round was held at the Marina Bay Sands, the venue for the semifinals and finals. It was shown at end of the final auditions episode first aired on April 9, 2015. Wu was not physically present during the deliberation round, his input being relayed through Foster, who along with Anggun and Melanie C chose the 20 remaining acts who would compete in semi-finals. The four Golden Acts and the judges' picks would bring the total number of semifinalists to 24. The first eight semifinalists were announced after the deliberation round, with the others to be revealed gradually as the semifinal rounds progress.

While the voting is similar to other voting processes in the Got Talent franchise, the revelation of results would be slightly different, to be revealed in the following week rather than the next night (as semifinal rounds are only once weekly, barring replays). Also, in another twist, the Golden Buzzer returns wherein each semifinal round, the judges would use it as one unit to send one act straight to the finals. This is similar to the Judges' Choice in the other local franchises, albeit one ahead of the vote rather than after and based on the vote. Aside from the Judges' Choice through the Golden Buzzer, the two acts with the most public votes would also advance to the finals. There would thus be a total of nine finalists emerging from the three semifinal rounds.

Ages listed are as of the time of the auditions. In the case of group acts, the age ranges only accounted for the members present at the auditions. The age(s) of any additional member(s) who only appeared in the semifinal may or may not be within the range designated.

Note

Semifinals summary

Semifinals 1: (April 16)

Semifinals 2: (April 23)

Semifinals 3: (April 30)

Finals
The finals, like the semifinals, will be held at the Marina Bay Sands over a span of two episodes, a performance night and a results night. It is presumed that the final two public vote finalists from the third semifinal round would be present together the finalists who already advanced.

Charice and illusionist Cosentino (Australia's Got Talent season 5 runner-up) performed in the results night, Charice singing "Lay Me Down" with Foster on piano and Cosentino performing a metamorphosis/escape act involving a cage and spikes. Anggun also sang "Snow on the Sahara" before joining the rest of the judges in covering their own version of "Let's Groove" by Earth, Wind & Fire.

Contestants who appeared on previous shows or seasons 
 El Gamma Penumbra, the winner of the first season, placed fourth on the third season of Pilipinas Got Talent.
 Gerphil Flores, the third placer of this season, was a semifinalist of the premiere season of Pilipinas Got Talent.
 The Velasco Brothers, a semifinalist, placed third on the first season of Pilipinas Got Talent.
 The Miss Tres was a semifinalist on the fourth season of Pilipinas Got Talent.
 Symmetry was also a semifinalist on the fourth season of Pilipinas Got Talent.
 Angelico "Echo" Claridad joined the first season of The Voice Kids in the Philippines. He turned all three chairs and joined Team Lea, but was eliminated in the Battles.
 Jeremiah Velasco auditioned in all five seasons of Pilipinas Got Talent. In his fifth season audition, he mentioned in front of the judges that he also auditioned on Asia's Got Talent. His audition was not aired.
 The Talento competed in the fourth season of Thailand's Got Talent, reaching the finals.
 Ira Christy Pitaloka, Rachzonja Adhy Kirana Putra, Ni Luh Ayu Leny, The Blessing, Helen Renata Gunawan, Ari Wibowo, and Rifki Ardiansyah all appeared in the second season of Indonesia's Got Talent while Djitron Pah and Young Boys appeared as semifinalists in the first.
 Han Bok Hee auditioned on the second season of Korea's Got Talent, singing "Non, je ne regrette rien" by Edith Piaf, the same audition piece she used in this season.
 Bảo Cường and Nguyễn Thị Huyền Trang were semifinalists on the 2012 season of Vietnam's Got Talent.
 Neil Rey Garcia Llanes won the 2014 edition of the talent show Talentadong Pinoy.
 Roadfill Macasero of Fe and Roadfill is already known in the Philippines as one-half of a comic and song duo Moymoy Palaboy, the other half being his older brother and group namesake Moymoy.
 Indian martial arts group Bir Khalsa placed third in the second season of India's Got Talent. They also appeared in the third season of the joint Czech-Slovak franchise Česko Slovensko má talent; their audition there and their audition in this season both did not result in their favor.

References

External links
 Asia's Got Talent official website

2010s Singaporean television series
2015 Singaporean television series debuts
Got Talent
2015 Singaporean television seasons